The Pacific-Asia Curling Championships (formerly the Pacific Curling Championships) are an annual curling tournament, held every year in November or December. The top team receives a berth to the World Curling Championships, while the second-placed team also receives a berth if the championships are held in the Americas or in Europe. The Pacific-Asia Curling Championships currently consist of teams from Australia, China, Chinese Taipei, Hong Kong, Japan, Kazakhstan, New Zealand, Qatar and South Korea. In 2018 WCF Congress, Nigeria is announced as the first African country accepted as member and will compete in the PAC zone beginning in 2019. Tournaments have been played in Canada, but Canada has never participated, since it is not part of the Pacific Zone.

Summary

Men

Women

Medal summary

Men's medal summary
As of 2021

Women's medal summary
As of 2021

References 
WCF Results & Statistics
Sports123 

 
International curling competitions
Curling
Oceanian championships
Recurring sporting events established in 1991
Recurring sporting events disestablished in 2021